1954 in Algeria:

Events
 September 9 – The 6.7  Chlef earthquake shakes northern Algeria with a maximum Mercalli intensity of XI (Extreme). The shock destroyed Orléansville, left 1,243–1,409 dead, and 5,000 injured.
November 1 – The movement towards Algerian independence from France starts with the founding of the National Liberation Front.

Births
April 7 – Louisa Hanoune, politician and head of Algeria's Parti des Travailleurs (PT), or Workers' Party.
October 8 – Jean Fernandez, football manager
October 19 – Abdallah Baali, diplomat

References

 
Algeria